de Villagra or de Villagrá is a surname. Notable people with the surname include:

Francisco de Villagra (1511–1563), Spanish conquistador
Gaspar Pérez de Villagrá (1555–1620), Spanish explorer
Pedro de Villagra (1513–1577), Spanish explorer and general

See also
Villagra (disambiguation)